Blénod may refer to the following places in France:
 Blénod-lès-Pont-à-Mousson, Meurthe-et-Moselle
 Blénod-lès-Toul, Meurthe-et-Moselle